Cheng Long (born 25 May 2000) is a Chinese swimmer. He competed in the men's 800 metre freestyle at the 2020 Summer Olympics.

At the 2018 Junior Pan Pacific Swimming Championships, in Suva, Fiji, Long won the gold medal in the 1500 metre freestyle with a time of 15:24.55 and the silver medal in the 800 metre freestyle with a time of 8:02.79.

References

External links
 

2000 births
Living people
Chinese male freestyle swimmers
Olympic swimmers of China
Swimmers at the 2020 Summer Olympics
Place of birth missing (living people)
21st-century Chinese people